The name Hector has been used for eight tropical cyclones in the Eastern Pacific Ocean:
 Hurricane Hector (1978) – a Category 4 hurricane
 Hurricane Hector (1982) – a Category 1 hurricane
 Hurricane Hector (1988) – a Category 4 hurricane; strongest of its season
 Tropical Storm Hector (1994) – a tropical storm that affected the Baja California Peninsula
 Hurricane Hector (2000) – a Category 1 hurricane whose remnants affected Hawaii
 Hurricane Hector (2006) – a Category 2 hurricane that did not affect land
 Tropical Storm Hector (2012) – a tropical storm that affected Southwestern Mexico
 Hurricane Hector (2018) – a long-lived and strong Category 4 hurricane that crossed into the Western Pacific as a minimal tropical storm.

The name Hector has been used for one tropical cyclone in the Australian region:
 Cyclone Hector (1986) – caused significant flooding in western Australia

The name Hector has been used for one European windstorm:
 Storm Hector (2018)

Pacific hurricane set index articles
Australian region cyclone set index articles